Chrťany is a village and municipality in the Veľký Krtíš District of the Banská Bystrica Region of southern Slovakia.

History
In historical records, the village was first mentioned in 1227  (1227 Harkyan, 1339 Harakyan, 1349 Harkyan). During its History, it belonged to many noble families (Aba, Szecsény, Balassa). From 1554 to 1594 it was occupied by Turks. Successively it belonged to Divín and Modrý Kameň.

Genealogical resources

The records for genealogical research are available at the state archive "Statny Archiv in Banska Bystrica, Slovakia"

 Roman Catholic church records (births/marriages/deaths): 1811-1899 (parish B)
 Lutheran church records (births/marriages/deaths): 1785-1898 (parish B)

See also
 List of municipalities and towns in Slovakia

References

External links
 
Obec Chrťany
Surnames of living people in Chrtany

Villages and municipalities in Veľký Krtíš District